is a Japanese film director, screenwriter and film critic.

Biography
Kunitoshi Manda was a student at Rikkyo University, where he took Shigehiko Hasumi's filmology class.

Manda directed his first feature film, Unloved, in 2001. It won the Grand Rail d'Or prize and the Future Talent prize at the 2001 Cannes Film Festival.

The Tunnel, one of his television films, screened at the 2004 Cannes Film Festival.

Manda's third feature film, The Kiss, premiered at the Jeonju International Film Festival in 2008. Japanese film critic Inuhiko Yomota praised the film as "a fantastic film."

His 2014 film, Dog's Way, premiered at the Yubari International Fantastic Film Festival.

Filmography

Feature films
Unloved (2001)
Thank You (2006)
The Kiss (2007)
Dog's Way (2014)
The Synchronizer (2017)
Love Mooning (2021)

Short films
Spaceship Remnant 6 (1996)
Omokage (2010)

Television
The Tunnel (2003)
Tokyo Girl (2008, episode 3)

Bibliography
Sairishū Tottemo Hazukashi Zemināru (2009)

References

External links

Japanese film directors
Japanese screenwriters
Japanese film critics
1956 births
Rikkyo University alumni
Living people